Gediminas Ziemelis (born April 4, 1977) is a Lithuanian businessman, entrepreneur and business consultant, selected twice among the top 40 most talented young industry leaders by Aviation Week & Space Technology. He is currently the Chairman of the Board at Avia Solutions Group and former Chairman of the Board at Vertas Management AB (former ZIA Valda).

In December 2022, Gediminas Ziemelis was listed as the richest Lithuanian by TOP Magazine, with estimated assets worth 1.68 billion Euro.

Biography 

In 1999, Gediminas Ziemelis graduated from Vilnius Gediminas Technical University with a Bachelor degree in business management. In 2004, after completing studies at Mykolas Romeris University, he received master's degree in Law.

Gediminas Ziemelis is an internationally well-known aviation expert, twice awarded as one of the most talented young leaders in the global aerospace industry under age of 40. Gediminas Ziemelis was acknowledged by the European Business Awards and received national champion award in the entrepreneurship category for his visionary inspiration and innovative approach to business development while leading Avia Solutions Group.

During his career he led three companies to IPO, supported and consulted Chinese Banks: total value of transactions in the CIS region – more than USD 2 billion, led a team of experts in a successful working session of the establishment of a joint venture with the Henan Province and China Aviation Agency: deal worth USD 900 million, more than 10 successful startups like: Locatory.com, Laserpas.com, Skycop.com, AviationCV.com, etc.

Gediminas Ziemelis is also a guest lecturer at Vilnius University, Vilnius Gediminas Technical University as well as business conferences in Lithuania and worldwide. He is also a sponsor of various sports, educational, voluntary and charitable organizations projects.

Career 

 1999–2001 – Deputy Manager of the Vindication Sector in the Department of Problem Assets and Vindication of the Lithuanian Savings Bank (currently known as Swedbank)
2001–2005 – the CEO of Zvilgsnis is Arciau UAB (currently known as Creditinfo Group)
2002–2006 – the CEO of ZIA Valda
2006–2014 – Business Development Director at ZIA Valda
2012–2014 – chairman of the board at AviaAM Leasing
2010–2017 – Member of the Supervisory Board at Agrowill Group (currently AUGA Group)
Since 2009 – chairman of the board and Business Development Director at Avia Solutions Group
 2008-2020 – chairman of the board at Vertas Management AB (former ZIA Valda).

Business

Gediminas Ziemelis is engaged in aviation business, real estate management, duty-free retail, pharmacy, hospitality, aircraft finance, IT, etc.

During the period of 2010–2013 Gediminas Ziemelis, as a chairman of the board at all companies, conducted IPO of three enterprises – Avia Solutions Group, AviaAM Leasing and Agrowill Group (currently AUGA Group). Although the initial public offering of Avia Solutions Group's shares was planned in 2010, the offering was postponed due to unsatisfying share prices. Avia Solutions Group finally went public a year later. The company was elected one of the best debutants of the Warsaw Stock Exchange in 2011, while in 2013 it was awarded with Polish Business Award in category "Increase of share price of Lithuanian company on the Warsaw Stock Exchange" IPO of AviaAM Leasing – an aircraft leasing, acquisition and sales company was conducted in 2013. However, according to some experts, the offering wasn't very successful, as the company managed to attract twice less money than planned.

Aviation

During the period of 2014–2016, as the chairman of the board, Gediminas Ziemelis led Avia Solutions Group in completing several major projects – opening of the aviation professional training base in Singapore together with its subsidiary BAA Training, construction of the modern 8500 sq m aircraft maintenance hangar in Kaunas, establishment of tour operator KIDY Tour and UAV service provider Laserpas.

In 2015, cooperating with BAA Training and Kazimieras Simonavicius University, Avia Solutions Group engaged in a project of establishment and development of AeroTraining cluster near Vilnius International Airport. The cluster will include aviation specialists training facility as well as hotel located in the near proximity of the airport for pilots and other industry professionals.

In 2016, Avia Solutions Group subsidiary FL Technics opened its third MRO hangar in Soekarno-Hatta International Airport, Jakarta, Indonesia, while Helisota launched maintenance works on Airbus Helicopters including HC120, HC135, HC145 (ЕС120, ЕС135, ЕС145) and BGS has become a strategic partner of The International Air Transport Association (IATA).

Furthermore, In 2016, under the leadership of Gediminas Ziemelis, the Group and its subsidiaries continued growing as AviationCV.com has become the most visited aviation job search platform in the world, KlasJet added 3rd aircraft – Hawker 800XP to its fleet, Kidy Tour its operations to Estonia.

In 2017, Gediminas Ziemelis led BGS to an expansion to a new market – Czech Republic, while KlasJet added first narrow-body business jet to its fleet – Boeing 737, as well as Storm Aviation introduced Base Maintenance services at Diamond Hangar at London Stansted airport.

Avia Solutions Group currently has over 100 subsidiaries including these companies: Baltic Ground Services (BGS), Locatory.com, BAA Training, AviationCV.com, KlasJet, Helisota, Kidy Tour, Jet Maintenance Solutions, Loop, FL Technics and its units : FL Technics Engine Services, FL Technics Logistics Solutions, Storm Aviation, Chevron Technical Services, FlashLine Maintenance, Wright International, FL ARI, FL Techhnics Indonesia.

In June 2019 Avia Solutions Group entered into agreement to acquire UK-based Chapman Freeborn Group and in July the Group has signed a $60 million worth Joint Venture agreement to establish a new training center in Zhengzhou city, Henan province (China) in partnership with Henan Civil Aviation Development and Investment Company (HNCA).

In 2020, under the leadership of Gediminas Ziemelis, Avia Solutions Group acquired ground handling and fuelling company Aviatior, cargo and charter operator BlueBird Nordic, multi-purpose arena Avia Solutions Group Arena and the largest ticket distributor in Lithuania - Tiketa. Additionally, the company joined the American Chamber of Commerce in Lithuania.

In September 2021, Avia Solutions Group, of which Gediminas Ziemelis is majority shareholder, announced an entry into a strategic partnership with Certares Management LLC through a 300 million euro investment.

Real estate

As chairman of the board at Vertas Management (former ZIA Valda), Gediminas led the company through numerous investment, acquisition and development projects including Zverynas lofts, Smolensko business centre, Zveryno verslo fabrikas. In addition to that, Vertas Management (former ZIA Valda) also manages over 20 000 sq m of leased land via VA Reals.

In 2020, the construction of the second Avia Solutions Group representative office in Vilnius began.

Duty free

In 2014, ZIA Valda and Gediminas Ziemelis engaged in the business of duty free by establishing international duty free operator Globus Distribution. The company operates a wide network of retail shops located in various air, road and rail border crossings across Ukraine and Lithuania.

Pharmacy

In 2017 established pharmaceutical holding Pharnasanta Group. At the moment, the pharmacy group consists of Ilsanta, a pharmaceutical company distributing medical devices and equipment, an Estonian clinic 4 Kliinik providing health services, and Nordic Metrology Science, an international metering centre. 

In 2021, the Pharnasanta Group became Pharmasanta Group.

IT

In 2017, Gediminas Ziemelis actively participated in the creation of an international flight claim management platform Skycop.com. SKYCOP was launched in the beginning of summer 2017.

Basketball

In 2022, Gediminas Ziemelis introduced his basketball club BC Wolves. BC Wolves are already competing in the Lithuanian Basketball League (LKL) and the European North Basketball League (ENBL). The club is currently playing its home matches in Alytus Arena but will move to the newly renovated Avia Solutions Group Arena in Vilnius in 2023.

Philanthropy 

Gediminas Ziemelis supported the Prienai-Birštonas basketball club ‘Vytautas‘ and basketball players Ball brothers. This support helped to attract USA basketball players, brothers LiAngelo and LaMelo Ball to the team.

Gediminas Ziemelis is one of the general sponsors of the oldest Lithuanian basketball club ‘Zalgiris‘. G. Ziemelis not only supports the club financially but he also supported ‘Zalgiris‘ by providing a business class ‘Boeing 737’ aircraft which allows the players to travel to the competitions. The exclusive 56 seats business class aircraft is specially designed for the tall basketball players to make their travels more comfortable and less exhausting.

He is one of the main sponsors of the Extend your hand to kindness 2015 charity event as well as one of the major supporters of Rimantas Kaukenas charity group. In 2012 Rimantas Kaukenas, the defender of the national Lithuanian basketball team, established the charity and support group ‘Rimantas Kaukenas‘ support group‘. The main objective of the group is to help children with oncological diseases by providing moral and financial support for the children and their families.

References 

1977 births
Living people
Businesspeople from Vilnius
Businesspeople in aviation
Vilnius Gediminas Technical University alumni
Mykolas Romeris University alumni